Salara is a comune (municipality) in the Province of Rovigo in the Italian region Veneto, located about  southwest of Venice and about  southwest of Rovigo.

Salara borders the following municipalities: Bagnolo di Po, Calto, Ceneselli, Felonica, Ficarolo, Trecenta.

References

External links
 Official website

Cities and towns in Veneto